The Pleistocene bush dog (Speothos pacivorus) is an extinct canid species in the genus Speothos from the Late Pleistocene. It was a relative of the extant bush dog. When compared to the bush dog, S. pacivorus had an overall larger body size, a straighter radial shaft and a double-rooted second lower molar.

References 

Speothos
Prehistoric canines
Holocene extinctions
Pleistocene carnivorans
Pleistocene mammals of South America
Lujanian
Pleistocene Brazil
Holocene Brazil
Fossils of Brazil
Fossil taxa described in 1839